Imane Saoud (born 6 June 2002) is a Moroccan footballer who plays as a midfielder for Swiss Women's Super League club FC Basel and the Morocco women's national team.

Club career 
Saoud has played for FC Vendenheim in France and for Basel in Switzerland.

International career
Saoud made her senior debut for Morocco on 10 June 2021 in a 3–0 friendly home win over Mali.

See also
List of Morocco women's international footballers

References

External links 

2002 births
Living people
Footballers from Casablanca
Moroccan women's footballers
Women's association football midfielders
FC Basel Frauen players
Swiss Women's Super League players
Morocco women's international footballers
Moroccan expatriate footballers
Moroccan expatriate sportspeople in Switzerland
Expatriate women's footballers in Switzerland
Moroccan emigrants to France
Naturalized citizens of France
French women's footballers
France women's youth international footballers
French expatriate footballers
French expatriate sportspeople in Switzerland
French sportspeople of Moroccan descent